Dahria Beatty (born 7 March 1994) is a Canadian cross-country skier who competes internationally.

Career
She competed for Canada at the FIS Nordic World Ski Championships 2017 in Lahti, Finland, at the 2018 Winter Olympics, and at the 2019 World Championships.

On January 13, 2022, Beatty was officially named to Canada's 2022 Olympic team.

Cross-country skiing results
All results are sourced from the International Ski Federation (FIS).

Olympic Games

World Championships

World Cup

Season standings

References 

1994 births
Living people
Canadian female cross-country skiers
Cross-country skiers at the 2018 Winter Olympics
Cross-country skiers at the 2022 Winter Olympics
Olympic cross-country skiers of Canada
Sportspeople from Whitehorse
21st-century Canadian women